Parkside railway station was the only station on the Derbyshire Dales Narrow Gauge Railway. Derbyshire Dales Narrow Gauge Railway was a short narrow-gauge railway operating at Rowsley South, and operated ex-industrial diesels and carriages similar to the Golden Valley light railway at the Midland Railway Centre.

References

Heritage railway stations in Derbyshire